Leganes, officially the Municipality of Leganes,  is a 4th class municipality in the province of Iloilo, Philippines. According to the 2020 census, it has a population of 34,725 people.

Like most Philippine towns that sprawl outward from the capital, is made up of houses, farms and light agricultural industry. The major thoroughfare runs right through the center of the town.

Leganes is a part of the Metro Iloilo–Guimaras area, centered on Iloilo City.

History
The history of Leganes was much connected to Jaro. It was once a place not worthy of attention for centuries. It was primarily a wetland in the coastline with large swaths of marsh and swamps and then wild beast roamed freely in the upper part. A settlement formed in the area called Guihaman.

By virtue of Act No. 719 of 1903, Leganes was made a part of the municipality of Santa Barbara.  By Executive Order No. 97 of December 6, 1915, Leganes was removed from Santa Barbara and made a part of Jaro with effect on January 1, 1916.

By Executive Order No. 241 of December 23, 1939, the "arrabal de Leganes" was separated from the municipality of Jaro and constituted as its own separate municipality, taking effect on January 1, 1940.

Geography

Barangays
Leganes is politically subdivided into 18 barangays.

Climate

Demographics

Economy

References

External links
 [ Philippine Standard Geographic Code]
 Philippine Census Information
 Local Governance Performance Management System

Municipalities of Iloilo